The Sea Peoples were a confederacy of seafaring raiders of the second millennium BC.

Sea People may also refer to:
The Sea People, accessory for the Dungeons & Dragons fantasy role-playing game
 People of the Sea (novel), a 1993 novel in the First North Americans series
 People of the Sea (film), a 1925 German silent drama film
 Sea People (film), a 1999 American made for TV film
Peoples of the Sea, a work of pseudohistory by Immanuel Velikovsky in his Ages in Chaos series
 Orang Laut, Malay for "Sea Peoples"